Chronic liver disease in the clinical context is a disease process of the liver that involves a process of progressive destruction and regeneration of the liver parenchyma leading to fibrosis and cirrhosis. "Chronic liver disease" refers to disease of the liver which lasts over a period of six months. It consists of a wide range of liver pathologies which include inflammation (chronic hepatitis), liver cirrhosis, and hepatocellular carcinoma. The entire spectrum need not be experienced.

Signs and symptoms
Signs of chronic liver disease detectable on clinical examination can be divided into those that are associated with the diagnosis of chronic liver disease, associated with decompensation, and associated with the cause.

Chronic liver disease
 Nail clubbing
 Palmar erythema
 Spider nevi (angiomata)
 Gynaecomastia
 Feminising hair distribution
 Testicular atrophy
 Small irregular shrunken liver
 Anaemia
 Caput medusae

Decompensation
 Drowsiness (encephalopathy)
 Hyperventilation (encephalopathy)
 Metabolic flap/asterixis (encephalopathy)
 Jaundice (excretory dysfunction)
 Ascites (portal hypertension and hypoalbuminemia)
 Leukonychia (hypoalbuminaemia)
 Peripheral oedema (hypoalbuminaemia)
 Bruising (coagulopathy)
 Acid-base imbalance, most commonly respiratory alkalosis

Signs associated with the cause
 Dupuytren's contracture (alcohol)
 Parotid enlargement (alcohol)
 Peripheral neuropathy (alcohol and some drugs)
 Cerebellar signs (alcohol and Wilson's disease)
 Liver enlargement (alcohol, NAFLD, haemochromatosis)
 Kayser-Fleisher rings (Wilson's disease)
 Increased pigmentation of the skin (haemochromatosis)
 Signs of right heart failure

Note that other diseases can involve the liver and cause hepatomegaly but would not be considered part of the spectrum of chronic liver disease. Some examples of this would include chronic cancers with liver metastases, infiltrative haematological disorders such as chronic lymphoproliferative conditions, chronic myeloid leukaemias, myelofibrosis and metabolic abnormalities such as Gaucher's disease and glycogen storage diseases.

Complications 
 Portal hypertension
 Ascites
 Hypersplenism (with or without splenomegaly)
 Lower oesophageal varices and rectal varices
 Synthetic dysfunction
 Hypoalbuminaemia
 Coagulopathy
 Hepatopulmonary syndrome
 Hepatorenal syndrome
 Encephalopathy
 Hepatocellular carcinoma

Causes 
The list of conditions associated with chronic liver disease is extensive and can be categorised in the following way:

Viral causes
 Hepatitis B
 Hepatitis C

Cytomegalovirus (CMV), Epstein Barr virus (EBV), and yellow fever viruses cause acute hepatitis.

Toxic and drugs
 Alcoholic liver disease
 Rarely drug induced liver disease from methotrexate, amiodarone, nitrofurantoin and others
Paracetamol (acetaminophen) causes acute liver damage.

Metabolic
 Non-alcoholic fatty liver disease
 Haemochromatosis
 Wilson's disease

Autoimmune response causes
 Primary biliary cholangitis (previously known as primary biliary cirrhosis)
 Primary sclerosing cholangitis
 Autoimmune Hepatitis

Other
 Right heart failure

Risk factors
These differ according to the type of chronic liver disease.
 Excessive alcohol use
 Obesity
 Metabolic syndrome including raised blood lipids
 Health care professionals who are exposed to body fluids and infected blood
 Sharing infected needle and syringes
 Having unprotected sex and multiple sex partners
 Working with toxic chemicals without wearing safety clothes
 Certain prescription medications

Diagnosis
Chronic liver disease takes several years to develop and the condition may not be recognised unless there is clinical awareness of subtle signs and investigation of abnormal liver function tests.

Testing for chronic liver disease involves blood tests, imaging including ultrasound, and a biopsy of the liver. The liver biopsy is a simple procedure done with a fine thin needle under local anaesthesia. The tissue sample is sent to a laboratory where it is examined underneath a microscope.

Treatment
The treatment of chronic liver disease depends on the cause. Specific conditions may be treated with medications including corticosteroids, interferon, antivirals, bile acids or other drugs.  Supportive therapy for complications of cirrhosis include diuretics, albumin, vitamin K, blood products, antibiotics and nutritional therapy.  Other patients may require surgery or a transplant. Transplant is required when the liver fails and there is no other alternative.

Alternative medicine
Some studies seems to indicate herbal remedies are useful, without being conclusive.  Some support may be found in the orthodox medical use of two of these:  N-acetyl cysteine (NAC), is the treatment of choice for acetaminophen overdose; both NAC and milk-thistle (Silybum marianum) or its derivative silibinin are used in liver poisoning from certain mushrooms, notably Amanita phalloides, although the use of milk-thistle is controversial.  Some common herbs are known or suspected to be harmful to the liver, including black cohosh, ma huang, chaparral, comfrey, germander, greater celandine, kava, mistletoe, pennyroyal, skull cap and valerian.

See also
 MELD-Plus, a rating system used to assess the severity of chronic liver disease

References

Diseases of liver